"Partant pour la Syrie" is a French patriotic song, the music of which was written by  Hortense de Beauharnais and the text by Alexandre de Laborde, in or about 1807.

Background 

The song was inspired by Napoleon I's campaign in Egypt and Syria. It represents a chivalric composition of the aspirations of a crusader knight in a style typical of the First French Empire. Hortense (Napoleon I's stepdaughter and the mother of Napoleon III) indicated in her Memoires that she wrote the music when she lived at Malmaison. During its popularity in the 19th century, the song was arranged for numerous instruments by various composers.

The poem by Laborde was originally titled Le beau Dunois, telling the story of the handsome crusader Dunois. Prior to his departure to Syria, he prays to the Virgin Mary that he will love the most beautiful woman and that he himself may be the bravest, and his prayers are answered. On his return, the brave warrior wins the hand of Isabella, the daughter of his liege lord, and love and honor prevail.

Popularity 

The song was popular during the remainder of the First Empire, with Hortense in her exile at Arenenberg, and with the Bonapartists during the Bourbon Restoration. Partant pour la Syrie was the unofficial national anthem during the Second Empire, an era when La Marseillaise was regarded with suspicion. After the collapse of the Second Empire, the song was played to the Emperor Napoleon III as he departed from Schloss Wilhelmshöhe to his exile in England in 1871, but by the time of Empress Eugénie's funeral in 1920, the band did not know it and played La Marseillaise instead. Partant pour la Syrie did, however, achieve a posthumous fame as one of the quoted tunes in "Fossils" from Camille Saint-Saëns's Carnival of the Animals, written in 1886 but not published until 1922.

It remains part of the repertoire of French military music.

Lyrics

References 

 Baguley, David. Napoleon III and His Regime: An Extravaganza. Louisiana State University Press, 2000,

External links 
 The melody
 Score of the song  at imslp

French patriotic songs
Historical national anthems
1807 songs
French anthems
Second French Empire
Songs about parting
Songs about Asia